Susannah Scaroni (born May 16, 1991) is an American Paralympic athlete. She won the gold medal in the women's 5000 meters T54 event at the 2020 Summer Paralympics held in Tokyo, Japan. She also represented the United States at the 2012 Summer Paralympics and at the 2016 Summer Paralympics.

Early life
Scaroni injured her spinal cord at the T12 vertebra in a car accident when she was five years old, and had to use a wheelchair thereafter.

Career 
At the 2012 Summer Paralympics, she finished in 8th place in the women's marathon T54 event. Four years later, she also competed in the same event finishing in 7th place. She also competed in the women's 800 meters T54 event at the 2016 Summer Paralympics where she did not qualify to compete in the final.

In 2018, she won the Peachtree Road Race held in Atlanta, Georgia in the wheelchair category with a time of 22:49.05.

In 2019, she competed at the World Para Athletics Championships winning the bronze medals in the women's 5000 m T54 and women's 800 m T54 events.

She represented the United States at the 2020 Summer Paralympics in Tokyo, Japan.

In 2022 she won the 2022 Open Women's Division of the Shepherd Center Wheelchair Division of the AJC Peachtree Road Race in Atlanta, Georgia with the time 21:14.71 setting a new course record.

She trains with the University of Illinois wheelchair racing team.

Marathons 

Scaroni has also competed in numerous marathon competitions including most marathons that are part of the World Marathon Majors.

In the Chicago Marathon she won 1st place in 2022, and finished in 2nd place in the 2012, 3rd in the 2018 and 4th in  2019.

In the London Marathon Scaroni also finished in 7th place both in 2013 and 2016, 4th in 2014, 5th in 2015, and 3rd both in 2017 and 2018.

In the Boston Marathon she ended up in 3rd place in 2014, 2015 and 2017, 4th in 2016, and 2nd in 2018.

In the Tokyo Marathon Scaroni ended it in 5th place in 2018 and 3rd in 2019.

In 2019, she also ended in 3rd in the New York City Marathon.

In 2013 and 2014, Scaroni won the Los Angeles Marathon in the wheelchair category.

She was placed 6th in the women's marathon T54 event at the 2020 Summer Paralympics in Tokyo, Japan.

Achievements

References

External links 

 
 
 

Living people
1991 births
People from Burns, Oregon
American female wheelchair racers
Paralympic wheelchair racers
Athletes (track and field) at the 2012 Summer Paralympics
Athletes (track and field) at the 2016 Summer Paralympics
Athletes (track and field) at the 2020 Summer Paralympics
Paralympic track and field athletes of the United States
People with paraplegia
People from Tekoa, Washington
Track and field athletes from Oregon
Track and field athletes from Washington (state)
American people of Italian descent
Medalists at the 2020 Summer Paralympics
Paralympic medalists in athletics (track and field)
Paralympic gold medalists for the United States
Paralympic bronze medalists for the United States
University of Illinois Urbana-Champaign alumni
Illinois Fighting Illini Paralympic athletes
21st-century American women